Jordan requires its residents to register their motor vehicles and display vehicle registration plates. The country's international vehicle registration code is HKJ.

The current system was introduced in 2007, with the plates largely based on European specifications. The font used strongly resembles that found on present British registration plates.

For passenger cars, private plates are also available. As of August 2013, the normal series had reached 21-30000; however, private plates going up to a 35 prefix have been seen. Generally, the lower the suffix number, the more expensive they are, with plates from the 10 series having the most prestige. Suffix numbers on private plates can be as low as one digit and therefore technically the "first number" is 10-1. The format is: nn-nnnnn (usually 4 or 5 digits). Initial numbers include:

References

Jordan
Transport in Jordan
 Registration plates